Adenanthera pavonina  is a perennial and non-climbing species of leguminous tree.  Its uses include food and drink, traditional medicine, and timber.

Common names and synonyms
Adenanthera pavonina is commonly called Red Lucky Seed.  Other common names for the tree include Acacia Coral, Arbre À Église, Bead Tree, Circassian Seed, Corail Végétal, Coral Wood, madhoshi, Coralitos, Curly Bean, Deleite, Delicia, Dilmawi, Graine-réglisse, Jumbi-Bead, L'Église, Peronías, Peonía, Peonía Extranjera, Piriquiti, Red Bead Tree, and Réglisse.  Barbados pride, Peacock flower fence, Sandalwood tree, Saga, and Manchadi are additional common names.  Synonyms for the tree include Adenanthera gersenii Scheff., Adenanthera polita Miq., and Corallaria parvifolia Rumph. In Kerala where Adenanthera pavonina trees are abundant, the seeds are called Manjadi (മഞ്ചാടി). In Tamil Nadu the seeds are called Aanai Kundumani (ஆனை குண்டுமணி). In Maldives the tree is called Madhoshi Gas (މަދޮށިގަސް) and the seeds are called Madhoshi (މަދޮށި).In Tulu the tree is called Manjotti. In Sri Lanka, the tree is called Madatiya in Sinhala.

Distribution

The tree is common within the tropics of the old world. It has also been introduced in the following countries of the Americas:
 Brazil, especially in Caatinga vegetation; Costa Rica,Maldives, Honduras, Cuba, Jamaica,  Puerto Rico, Trinidad, Tobago, Venezuela,  and the United States, especially in southern Florida.

Uses
This tree is useful for nitrogen fixation, and it is often cultivated for forage, as an ornamental garden plant or urban tree, and as a medicinal plant. For example, the young leaves can be cooked and eaten. The raw seeds are toxic, but may be eaten when cooked.

Adenanthera pavonina seeds have long been a symbol of love in China, and its name in Chinese is xiang si dou, or "mutual love bean". The beauty of the seeds has led to them being used as beads for jewellery. The botanist Edred Corner stated that in India, the seeds have been used as units of weight for fine measures, of gold for instance, throughout recorded history because the seeds are known to be almost identical weights to each other. Indeed, the Malay name for the tree, saga, has been traced to the Arabic for 'goldsmith'. The small, yellowish flower grows in dense drooping rat-tail flower heads, almost like catkins. The curved hanging pods, with a bulge opposite each seed, split open into two twisted halves to reveal the hard, scarlet seeds. This tree is used for making soap, and a red dye can be obtained from the wood. The wood, which is extremely hard, is also used in boat-building, making furniture and for firewood.

The tree is fast-growing, with an attractive, spreading canopy that makes it suitable as a shade tree, and for ornamental purposes in large gardens or parks. However, it is also known for producing much litter in the form of leaves, twigs and especially seed pods which crack open while still on the branch, so releasing their seeds, before themselves falling to the ground.

In traditional medicine, a decoction of the young leaves and bark of Adenanthera pavonina is used to treat diarrhea.  Also, the ground seeds are used to treat inflammation.  Preliminary scientific studies appear to support these traditional uses.  In vitro studies show that Adenanthera pavonina leaf extract has antibacterial activity against the intestinal pathogen Campylobacter jejuni.  Also, high doses of seed extract have an anti-inflammatory effect in studies in rats and mice.

Chemical constituents
Adenanthera pavonina is a source of aliphatic natural products (O-acetylethanolamine and 1-octacosanol), carbohydrate (galactitol), simple aromatic natural products (2,4-dihydroxybenzoic acid), flavonoids (ampelopsin, butein, dihydrorobinetin, and robinetin), terpenoids (echinocystic acid and oleanolic acid), steroids (daucosterol, β-sitosterol, and stigmasterol), amino acids and peptides (2-amino-4-ethylidenepentanedioic acid and γ-methyleneglutamine), and alkaloids (O-acetylethanolamine and 1H-imidazole).

References

External links

Adenanthera pavonina
USDA Plants Profile: Adenanthera pavonina
Adenanthera pavonina L. Medicinal Plant Images Database (School of Chinese Medicine, Hong Kong Baptist University)  

pavonina
Medicinal plants of Asia
Trees of China
Flora of tropical Asia
Flora of the Northern Territory
Decorative fruits and seeds
Plants described in 1753
Taxa named by Carl Linnaeus